Arthur Billings McEwan (August 11, 1924 – August 23, 1989) was a Canadian football player who played for the Saskatchewan Roughriders. He played junior football in Montreal.

References

1924 births
1989 deaths
Saskatchewan Roughriders players